Chronic testicular pain is long-term pain of the testes. It is considered chronic if it has persisted for more than three months. Chronic testicular pain may be caused by injury, infection, surgery, cancer or testicular torsion and is a possible complication after vasectomy. IgG4-related disease is a more recently identified cause of chronic orchialgia.

One author describes the syndromes of chronic testicular pain thus:

Diagnosis
Testing for gonorrhea and chlamydia should be routinely performed.

Differential diagnosis
 Post-vasectomy pain syndrome

Treatment
Treatment is often with NSAIDs and antibiotics however, this  is not always effective.

References

Pain
Testicle disorders
Men's health